Xanthoeme signaticornis is a species of beetle in the family Cerambycidae, the only species in the genus Xanthoeme.

References

Xystrocerini
Monotypic beetle genera